Bewegte Männer (Moving Men) is a German sitcom television series, based on the comic by Ralf König. 39 episodes were aired on Sat. 1 between 2003 and 2005.

See also
List of German television series

External links
 

German comedy television series
2003 German television series debuts
2005 German television series endings
Television shows based on comics
Sat.1 original programming
German-language television shows
German LGBT-related television shows